Acleris supernova is a species of moth belonging to the family Tortricidae. It is found in Ecuador.

The wingspan is about 17 mm. The head is whitish yellow and the thorax is yellow. The round colour is yellow preserved in costal, dorsopostbasal (paler), and terminal (slightly tinged rust) parts of wing. The remaining area is suffused rust-brown except for the dorsal
half where it is blackish brown. Markings are blackish brown in the form of incomplete postbasal and median fasciae. The hindwing is pale brownish grey, although whiter towards the base.

Etymology
The name refers to the excellent (or super) colouration of this moth.

References

Moths described in 2009
supernova
Moths of South America
Taxa named by Józef Razowski